Georges Elgozy (14 April 1909 –  – 13 July 1989) was Inspector General of the National Economy and President of the European Committee for Economic and Cultural Cooperation. Throughout his career he published works combining minds and observations of his time, attacking the power invaded by the caste of elites of the "ENA". His witty words are often quoted.

Prize 

 1975: Prix Broquette-Gonin (literature) for Le Bluff du futur.
 1979: Prix de l'essai for De l’humour.

Publications 
 1953: 
1956: 
 1958: 
 1961: 
 1966: 
 1967: 
 1968: 
 1968: 
 1969: 
 1970 : 
 1970: 
1972: 
1972: 
 1973: 
 1974: 
1975: 
 1977: 
 1979: 
 1981: 
 1985: 
 1986:

References

External links 
Citations by Georges Elgozy on allopensee.com.
.
.

Winners of the Prix Broquette-Gonin (literature)
People from Oran
1909 births
1989 deaths
20th-century French economists
Pieds-Noirs